Margaret Jordan Patterson (1867-1950) was an American woodblock printmaker and painter. 

The daughter of a Maine sea captain, Patterson was born on board her father's ship near Surabaya, Java. She then grew up in Boston and Maine. 

Her first art instruction came from a correspondence course given by the publisher Louis Prang. She then studied at the Pratt Institute starting in 1895. She also studied with Claudio Castellucho in Florence and Hermenegildo Anglada Camarasa in Paris. She also developed friendships with the artists Arthur Wesley Dow and Charles Woodbury. In 1910 she learned how to create color woodblock prints from Ethel Mars.

She later became head of the art department at Dana Hall School in Wellesley, Massachusetts, and held that job until she retired in 1940. She also worked as an art teacher in public schools in Massachusetts and New Hampshire. Some of her awards are honorable mention at the Panama–Pacific International Exposition in 1915, and a medal from the Philadelphia Watercolor Club in 1939. Her art is now held in the Cleveland Art Museum, the Metropolitan Museum of Art, the Oakland Art Museum, the Smithsonian American Art Museum and the Victoria and Albert Museum.

References

Margaret Jordan Patterson in the Smithsonian American Art Museum

Further reading
Margaret J. Patterson: Master of Color and Light

1867 births
1950 deaths
American women painters
American women printmakers
19th-century American painters
20th-century American painters
19th-century American women artists
20th-century American women artists
People from Wellesley, Massachusetts
Painters from Massachusetts
Pratt Institute alumni
20th-century American printmakers